Fikre Selassie Wogderess (13 July 1945 – 12 December 2020) was an Ethiopian politician who was the first Prime Minister of the People's Democratic Republic of Ethiopia (PDRE) from 10 September 1987 to 8 November 1989.

Biography
Fikre Selassie was one of the more obscure members of the Derg until the coup of 3 February 1977, in which Secretary-General Tafari Benti was killed along with seven other Derg members. The coup elevated him (Bahru Zewde notes "according to some sources from near execution by reason of mistaken identity!") to Secretary-General, in which post he would occasionally dispel "the atmosphere of total sycophancy" with his "fractionally independent disposition."

Fikre Selassie became the first Prime Minister of the newly-formed Communist state that replaced the Derg, in September 1987. He made a trip to Cairo in November 1988 to seek improved relations with Egypt, and to express support for Egypt's offer to negotiate a settlement of the Eritrean conflict. In November 1989, President Mengistu Haile Mariam ordered him removed from his post, having criticized him three days prior in a meeting of the Politburo of the Workers Party of Ethiopia, stating "there is no one quite like Fikre Selassie, who sits idly and quietly. One time, he sat here reading a magazine.... He is not antirevolutionary or a criminal, nor is he conspiratorial.... But he is unstable and even rude.... He is being expelled for disciplinary reasons also."

Following the conclusion of the Ethiopian Civil War and the end of the PDRE, Fikre was one of 46 former leaders of the PDRE who were tried in person beginning 19 April 1996 for murdering individuals, genocide, and crimes against humanity by the Federal Democratic Republic of Ethiopia; 22 more individuals, including the exiled Mengistu, were charged in absentia at the same trial. The trial ended on 26 May 2008, and Fikre Selassie Wogderess was sentenced to death. In December 2010, the Ethiopian government commuted the death sentence of Fikre Selassie and 23 other Derg officials. On 4 October 2011, Fikre Selassie was freed along with other 16 of his former colleagues, after twenty years of incarceration. The Ethiopian government paroled almost all of those Derg officials who had been jailed for 20 years.

Death
Fikre Selassie Wogderess died on 12 December 2020, upon receiving medical treatment for diabetes and kidney complications.

References 

1945 births
2020 deaths
Prime Ministers of Ethiopia
Workers' Party of Ethiopia politicians
Ethiopian people convicted of murder
Ethiopian people convicted of crimes against humanity
Ethiopian people convicted of genocide
People convicted of murder by Ethiopia
Ethiopian prisoners sentenced to death
Prisoners sentenced to death by Ethiopia
Ethiopian politicians convicted of crimes
Deaths from diabetes
20th-century Ethiopian politicians